Bischof is a surname. Notable people with the surname include:

 Gustav Bischof (1792–1870), German chemist
 Frank-Peter Bischof (born 1954), German canoeist
 Werner Bischof (1916–1954), Swiss photographer
 Kerstin Bischof (born 1980), German singer, vocalist of Xandria

See also 
 Bischoff
 Bishop

German-language surnames
Occupational surnames